Fleur Alison Bennett (born 18 June 1968) is a British television actress best known for her work on the sit-com Grace & Favour (a spin of from Are You Being Served?) and the Channel 5 soap opera Family Affairs.

Life and career
Bennett was born in St Ives in Cornwall, England on 18 June 1968. She was educated at Mountview Theatre School and Guildhall School of Music and Drama in London.

Bennett debuted in the Are You Being Served? spin-off Grace & Favour (1992–1993), in which she played the part of Mavis Moulterd. After the show ended, she had small appearances on Nelson's Column (1994) and Cracker (1995).

In 1997, she played Laura Forester in the mini-series The Rag Nymph. Between 1997 and 1999, she played Belinda Rhodes in the TV-series Family Affairs. She also made a guest appearance in Heartbeat in 1998.
Her television career in recent years has consisted mainly of guest appearances in Midsomer Murders (2001), Casualty (2002) and Down to Earth (2005).

Television roles

References

External links

Living people
British television actresses
Actresses from London
People from St Ives, Cornwall
1968 births
Alumni of the Guildhall School of Music and Drama
Actresses from Cornwall
20th-century English actresses
21st-century English actresses